Ameet Bhaskar Satam is a member of the 14th Maharashtra Legislative Assembly. He represents the Andheri-West Assembly Constituency for the second term. He belongs to the Bharatiya Janata Party.

References

External links
 http://www.dnaindia.com/mumbai/report-mla-leads-action-against-hawkers-at-20-spots-in-andheri-2081604
 http://www.dnaindia.com/mumbai/report-working-together-2103358
 http://www.mumbaimirror.com/mumbai/civic/Civic-body-okays-BJPs-move-for-night-markets/articleshow/48013288.cms
 http://www.dnaindia.com/mumbai/report-ameet-satam-calls-off-fast-after-better-street-light-promise-1952309
 http://www.mumbaimirror.com/mumbai/civic/BMC-orders-probe-against-26-officials-for-corruption/articleshow/51920498.cms
 http://www.mumbaimirror.com/mumbai/others/Saffron-vs-saffron-in-BMC-polls-as-Sena-BJP-go-solo/articleshow/51920539.cms

Maharashtra MLAs 2014–2019
Marathi politicians
Bharatiya Janata Party politicians from Maharashtra
Living people
People from Mumbai Suburban district
1976 births